Li Yongtai (4 November 1928 – 5 October 2015) was a Chinese fighter pilot and lieutenant general of the People's Liberation Army Air Force (PLAAF). An ethnic Korean, he fought in the Korean War and later served as deputy commander of the PLAAF.

Military career
Born in Tonghua, Jilin Province, China to an ethnic Korean family, Li joined the Eighth Route Army in October 1945, and became a member of the Communist Party of China (CPC) the following year. He began learning to fly in October 1949, and after China's entry into the Korean War, served as a member of the People's Volunteer Army Air Force. He shot down four American F-86s, earning him the nickname "tank in the sky". After the war he continued his rise through the ranks, and in 1975, was named commander of the Wuhan Military Region Air Force. From 1982 to 1993, he served as deputy commander of the PLAAF. He was awarded the rank of lieutenant general in 1988.

Political career
Li served as a representative to the 10th and 12th National Congresses of the CPC, and to the 5th, 7th, 8th, 9th, and 10th National People's Congresses (NPC). In the 8th and the 9th Congresses he was named a member of the NPC Standing Committee, and also served on the NPC Ethnic Affairs Committee.

References

1928 births
2015 deaths
Chinese Korean War pilots
Chinese politicians of Korean descent
Delegates to the 9th National People's Congress
Delegates to the 8th National People's Congress
Delegates to the 7th National People's Congress
Delegates to the 5th National People's Congress
People from Tonghua
People's Liberation Army Air Force generals